Nagercoil Town railway station (NJT) is an "HG-1" railway station located on the Kanyakumari district in Tamil Nadu. Nagercoil Town railway station comes under the Thiruvananthapuram Railway division of Southern Railways. It is on the Thiruvananthapuram–Nagercoil–Kanyakumari railway line between the Aaloor railway station and the Nagercoil Junction railway station. Nineteen trains halt on this station which has one platform and is in the Thiruvananthapuram division of the Southern Railway zone. The station is in proximity to Vadasery bus stand and Vetturnimadam.

Services 
19 trains halt at this station.

References

Railway stations in Kanyakumari district
Thiruvananthapuram railway division